The Men's China Squash Open 2016 is the men's edition of the 2016 China Squash Open, which is a tournament of the PSA World Tour event International (prize money: 100 000 $). The event took place in Shanghai in China from 1 September to 4 September. Mohamed El Shorbagy won his first China Squash Open trophy, beating Grégory Gaultier in the final.

Prize money and ranking points
For 2016, the prize purse was $100,000. The prize money and points breakdown is as follows:

Seeds

Draw and results

See also
2016 PSA World Tour
China Squash Open
Women's China Squash Open 2016

References

External links
PSA China Squash Open 2016 website
China Squash Open 2016 SquashSite website

Squash tournaments in China
China Squash Open
Squash Open
Sports competitions in Shanghai